The following is a synopsis of radio and television broadcast outlets for the Kansas City Chiefs, a franchise from the National Football League.

Radio 

From 1989 until the end of the 2019 season, Cumulus Media's KCFX (101.1), a.k.a. "101 The Fox", broadcast all Chiefs games on FM radio under the moniker of The Chiefs Fox Football Radio Network, one of the earliest deals where an FM station served as the flagship station of a team radio network. Since 1994, Mitch Holthus has served as play-by-play announcer. Former Chiefs quarterback Len Dawson served alongside Holthus for color commentary but starting in the 2016 season, Dawson's role was slowly minimized as he announced his retirement from broadcasting. The Chiefs and KCFX was the longest FM radio broadcast partnering tenure in the NFL. The Chiefs Radio Network extends throughout the six-state region of Missouri, Kansas, Iowa, Nebraska, Oklahoma, and Arkansas, with 61 affiliate stations.

With the start of the 2020 season, Audacy, Inc.'s WDAF-FM (106.5 FM) became the flagship of the Chiefs network, with sister station KCSP (610 AM) carrying surrounding analysis and team interview programming as well as selected simulcasts of live games, and the Audacy app streaming coverage of all games online on desktops/laptops only. The network's personnel, outside those exclusively contracted to Cumulus, were expected to be retained with the new Entercom contract.

Radio affiliates 

Chiefs games are broadcast in Missouri and Kansas as well as parts of Iowa, Oklahoma, Nebraska, New Mexico, Arkansas, Texas, and South Dakota. Stations in major cities are listed below.

Television

KCTV Channel 5 (CBS) broadcasts most Chiefs regular-season games, with exceptions as following. WDAF Channel 4 (Fox; that station is unrelated to WDAF-FM) broadcasts games in which the Chiefs host an NFC opponent. KSHB Channel 41 (NBC) broadcasts all games in which the Chiefs play on NBC Sunday Night Football or NBC's NFL playoffs coverage. KSHB also serves as the main broadcast provider of the team's pre-season games. KMBC Channel 9 (ABC) has aired Monday Night Football games locally since 1970.

Prior to the 1994 season, WDAF was the primary station for the Chiefs as an NBC affiliate (they aired on KMBC when ABC had the AFL package through 1964), since NBC had the AFC package. The inter-conference home games aired on KCTV starting in 1973 (when the NFL allowed local telecasts of home games). After week one of the 1994 season, WDAF switched to Fox (which got the NFC package), and has aired the Chiefs' inter-conference home games since. The bulk of the team's games moved to KSHB through the end of the 1997 season. Since that time, they have aired on KCTV, save for the 2015 Week 17 game vs. the Oakland Raiders, which aired on WDAF when the NFL cross-flexed the game from CBS to FOX.

Preseason game affiliates
Preseason games are broadcast throughout the states of Missouri and Kansas, as well as portions of Nebraska, Iowa, Oklahoma and Arkansas. Nearby major cities besides Kansas City with broadcasts include Wichita, Des Moines, Tulsa, and Lincoln.

References

Broadcasters
 
Kansas City Chiefs
Kansas City Chiefs
broadcasters